The  is a subway line, which forms part of the Nagoya Municipal Subway system in Nagoya, Japan. It runs from Takabata in Nakagawa Ward to Fujigaoka in Meitō Ward, all within Nagoya. The Higashiyama Line's color on maps is Windsor yellow; its stations carry the letter "H" followed by a number. All the stations accept manaca, a rechargeable contactless smart card.

The first section of the line opened in 1957. The line links Nagoya Station and Sakae, the CBD of Nagoya. As such, the line has the highest ridership among Nagoya Municipal Subway Lines. On arriving at Nagoya Station (from Fujigaoka), departing Nagoya Station (to Fujigaoka), or at Fujigaoka Station, the announcements are made in five languages, namely Japanese, English, Korean, Chinese, and Portuguese, in that order.

Stations 
The stations are as follows:

History
The Higashiyama Line was the first underground rapid transit line in Nagoya, and it opened initially on 15 November 1957 with three stations. The three stations were Nagoya Station, Fushimimachi Station (now ), and Sakaemachi Station (now ). At first, the subway had six 100 series EMU trainsets, formed with two cars per set.

Rolling stock 
All trains are based at Takabata and Fujigaoka Depots.

 5050 series (since 1992)
 N1000 series (since 2008)

Former
 100/200/250/500/700 series (1957-1999)
 300/800 series (1967-2000)
 5000 series (July 1980 – August 2015)

The 250, 300 and 700 series trains were later sold to Takamatsu-Kotohira Electric Railroad, where they were refurbished and reclassified as Kotoden 600 series (former 250/700 series) and Kotoden 700 series (former 300 series), and to the Argentinian transport company Metrovías S.A., where they serve Line C of the Buenos Aires Metro.

The last remaining 5000 series train in service was withdrawn following a special final run on 30 August 2015.

References

External links 

  

Nagoya Municipal Subway
Standard gauge railways in Japan
Railway lines opened in 1957
600 V DC railway electrification